Patricia Helen Grasso (born in Massachusetts, United States) is an American writer of romance novels.

She is a bestselling author who has won numerous recognitions, including a Romantic Times Reviewers’ Choice Award, a Romantic Times KISS Award, and a National Readers’ Choice Award.

Biography
Patricia H. Grasso was born in Massachusetts, is the daughter of Constantino and Helen Grasso. She earned bachelor's and master's degrees in English and, for thirty years, used her "leisure" time to teach in a public high school.

Currently, Patricia lives in Winchester, north of Boston, Massachusetts.

Bibliography

Deveraux-MacArthur Family Series
Emerald Enchantment (1992/Feb)
Highland Belle (1991/Feb)
Desert Eden (1993/Mar)
Loving in a Mist (1994/Nov)
Courting an Angel (1995/Nov)
My Heart's Desire (1997/Jan)

Dukes Series
Violets in the Snow (1998/Jan)
No Decent Gentleman (1999/Feb)
To Tame a Duke (2001/Jul)

Douglas Family Saga Series
To Tempt an Angel (2002/Jun)
To Charm a Prince (2003/Jun)
To Catch a Countess (2004/May)

Kazanov Royalty Series
To Charm a Prince (2003/Jun)
To Love a Princess (2004/Nov)
Seducing the Prince (2005/Apr)
Pleasuring the Prince (2006/Apr)
Tempting the Prince (2007/May)
Enticing The Prince (2008/Nov)
Marrying the Marquis (2009/Dec)

References

External links
Official website
List of books
Review of Pleasuring the Prince
Interview

20th-century American novelists
21st-century American novelists
American romantic fiction writers
American women novelists
Living people
Year of birth missing (living people)
20th-century American women writers
21st-century American women writers